The Oppy Family Fun Ride is a non competitive ride held in City of Knox, Melbourne, Victoria,  Australia, by the Knox City Council, in the memory of Hubert Opperman, who resided in Knox just before his death in 1996.

The event is part of The Knox Festival, held each year in summer. The route loops round the Knox area, past the many pieces of art dedicated to Hubert Opperman that can be found in the city environs.

See also

 Cycling in Melbourne

References 

Cycling in Melbourne
Cycling events in Victoria